Get Your Rocks Off may refer to:

 "Get Your Rocks Off", a 1967 Basement Tapes song by Bob Dylan and the Band
 Messin', titled Get Your Rocks Off in the US, a 1973 album by Manfred Mann's Earth Band
 Get Your Rocks Off, a 2002 album by Eddie and the Hot Rods
 "Get Your Rocks Off", a 2014 episode of the television series Sex Sent Me to the ER
 "Get Your Rocks Off", a task in the 2015 television series The Challenge: Battle of the Exes II

See also
 "Rocks" (song), a 1994 song by Primal Scream